John N. Wozniak (born March 21, 1956) is a Democratic politician. He served as a Pennsylvania State Senator from the 35th district from 1997 to 2016. Prior to that, he served as a member of the Pennsylvania House of Representatives from the 71st district from 1981 to 1996.

Wozniak was born to a military family. After spending his early childhood on a military base in Fort Knox, Kentucky, he returned to his family home in Johnstown, PA. Wozniak earned a degree in economics from the University of Pittsburgh at Johnstown, where he was a member of Delta Chi fraternity.

Wozniak was elected to the Pennsylvania House of Representatives in 1980, where he served until his election to the Senate of Pennsylvania in 1996.

Three months before the 2016 election, Wozniak announced his retirement, saying he wanted to spend time with his family while he still had time to do so.

He and his wife, Vanessa, have two children, Michael and Rachel.

On March 30, 2017, Governor Tom Wolf nominated Wozniak to the Pennsylvania Turnpike Commission.

Senate Committees
Finance Committee (chairman), Agriculture and Rural Affairs, Community and Economic Development, Game and Fisheries, and Intergovernmental Affairs

References

External links
John Wozniak State Senator official website
Pennsylvania State Senate - John Wozniak official PA Senate website

Follow the Money - John N Wozniak
2006 2004 2002 2000 campaign contributions

Pennsylvania state senators
1956 births
Living people
Members of the Pennsylvania House of Representatives
University of Pittsburgh at Johnstown alumni
American politicians of Polish descent
21st-century American politicians